Avsarlu (also, Arrjahur, Arjagur, Arjagur-Avsarlu, and Razvaliny Avsarlu) is a town in the Syunik Province of Armenia.

References 

Syunik Province